Coldham is a hamlet in Elm civil parish, part of the Fenland district of the Isle of Ely, Cambridgeshire, England. Coldham is the site of a wind farm on a large farm estate of the Cooperative Group near the settlement.

The parish formerly had a church dedicated to St. Ethelreda built in 1876. 
Mrs E.B. Tanqueray, whose husband was Bertram Tanqueray, vicar of Coldham, wrote 'The Royal Quaker', a novel about Jane Stuart publisher in 1904 by Methuen.
This church was declared redundant in 2000 and has since been converted into a house. The former war memorial from the church is now located at St Mark's, Friday Bridge. 
The settlement formerly had a railway station on the Great Eastern Railway, although there are proposals to reinstate a station as part of the Wisbech and March Bramley Line project.

History
Coldham, formerly known as 'Pear Tree Hill', was formed as a separate ecclesiastical parish in 1874.

References

Hamlets in Cambridgeshire
Fenland District